Kennebecasis Valley High School (KVHS) is a secondary school that serves students from grades 9 to 12 in Quispamsis, New Brunswick, Canada.

Mascot change 
On March 4, 2022, the mascot of Kennebecasis Valley High School was changed to "Knicky the Knight", a blue knight, following nearly 50 years of having "Ken the Crusader", as their previous mascot. The mascot change was put in place in order to give a more inclusive figure to represent the school.

Academic achievements 

 Kennebecasis Valley High School were National Champions on CBC's SmartAsk trivia competition in 2002 and came second in the following year.
 In 2010, the KVHS Reach for the Top team won the national championship. KV is the second team from New Brunswick to win the title in the 45-year history of the game. The team was 60-0 in all games played including national, provincial, and invitational (UTS Event) play. This was their fourth consecutive top-3 finish at Nationals.
 In 2011, the KVHS Reach for the Top team defended their title at the national championship, topping off a 14–0 record at the national championship. They are only the second school in the history of the tournament to win back-to-back championships and have finished in the top three for five straight years. Their 28-game winning streak at Nationals (2010 and 2011) is the longest in Reach history.
 Between April 2004 and November 2011, the KVHS Reach for the Top team won 273 consecutive games (40 consecutive tournaments) in New Brunswick. This is considered to be the longest streak ever in any province.
 In April 2015, the KVHS Reach for the Top team won the UTS University of Toronto Schools championship among many other teams competing in a close competition.
 In May 2015, the KVHS Reach for the Top team came in second place in the National Championship.
 In May 2016, the KVHS Reach for the Top team won the national championship.

In May 2017, two KVHS students competed in the "nationals" for the Canadian Parents for French National Speech Competition

Artistic achievements
KVHS is known in New Brunswick for their success at the New Brunswick Drama festival every year. The theatre program was started by the original principal William Bishop. Suzanne Doyle-Yerxa then ran the theatre program at the school from 1977 to 2010 before her retirement in June 2010. That year, a scholarship was commemorated under her name: The Suzanne Doyle-Yerxa award. It is awarded to a student who plans to pursue the performing arts or creative arts as a post secondary study. KVHS has also received attention for its strong visual arts and music programs.

Notable alumni 
Tricia Black, actor, comedian
Randy Jones (ice hockey), former NHL player
Rob Moore, Member of Parliament for Fundy Royal
Michael Yerxa, filmmaker

References

External links 
 Kennebecasis Valley High School

High schools in New Brunswick
Schools in Kings County, New Brunswick